Pomarkku is a municipality of Finland.

It is located in the Satakunta region.

The municipality is unilingually Finnish.

People born in Pomarkku
Oskari Vihantola (1876 – 1936)
Aulis Sileäkangas (1923 – 2013)
Raila Aho (1937 – )

References

External links

Municipality of Pomarkku – Official website 

 
Populated places established in 1868